Xiphopenaeus is a genus of crustaceans in the suborder Dendrobranchiata, the shrimps and prawns.

Two species are in this genus:
Xiphopenaeus kroyeri
Xiphopenaeus riveti

Likely, more species have not yet been described and named.

These were previously considered to be two names for the same species, but genetic analysis confirms they are two distinct species. X. kroyeri occurs in the Atlantic Ocean, while X. riveti lives in the Pacific. X. kroyeri, the seabob shrimp, is a very important food species fished off the coast of Brazil.

References

Penaeidae